The TimesDaily is the daily newspaper for Florence, Alabama.  The TimesDaily covers a four-county region in Alabama including Lauderdale, Colbert, Franklin, and Lawrence counties, as well as portions of southern Tennessee and northeast Mississippi. In addition to editorial offices in Florence, The TimesDaily maintains a state capital bureau in Montgomery.

The newspaper is owned by the Tennessee Valley Printing Co., which also publishes The Decatur Daily. The TimesDaily has a twelve-month average circulation of 28,900 daily and 30,500 Sunday.  Of the 25 daily newspapers published in Alabama, The TimesDaily has the seventh highest daily circulation.

The TimesDaily was founded in 1889 as The Florence Times and published its first edition on July 4, 1890. A sister paper, The Tri-Cities Daily, was founded in 1907. The merger of these two newspapers in 1967, which published for a time as The Florence Times—Tri-Cities Daily, gives The TimesDaily its distinctive name. In 1972, the TimesDaily was acquired by Worrell Newspapers. The New York Times Company acquired 8 daily papers, including the TimesDaily, from Worrell in 1982. The Tennessee Valley Printing Co. purchased the TimesDaily from the New York Times Regional Media Group, a subsidiary of the New York Times Company, in March 2009.

Magazine publishing
The TimesDaily also publishes three regional magazines: ShoalsWoman, Shoals Magazine, and Explore the Shoals.

Awards

2018 Better Newspaper Contest - Alabama Press Association

References

External links

Newspapers published in Alabama
Florence–Muscle Shoals metropolitan area
Publications established in 1890
Daily newspapers published in the United States